Transcription factor SOX-8 is a protein that in humans is encoded by the SOX8 gene.

This gene encodes a member of the SOX (SRY-related HMG-box) family of transcription factors involved in the regulation of embryonic development and in the determination of the cell fate. The encoded protein may act as a transcriptional activator after forming a protein complex with other proteins. This protein may be involved in brain development and function. Haploinsufficiency for this protein may contribute to the mental retardation found in haemoglobin H-related mental retardation (ATR-16 syndrome).

See also
 SOX genes

References

Further reading

Transcription factors